Miloš Đurković (born 29 February 1956) is a Bosnian Serb former football goalkeeper and manager who played for clubs in the former Yugoslavia and Turkey. He is known locally as Faks.

Playing career

Club
Born in Sarajevo, Đurković began playing football for local side FK Glasinac Sokolac. In 1977, he joined Yugoslav First League side FK Sarajevo. He spent nine seasons with the club, winning the 1984-85 championship.

Đurković joined Turkish Süper Lig side Beşiktaş J.K. in 1986. He returned to Yugoslavia to play the next season with Sarajevo, before joining Süper Lig side Adana Demirspor in 1988.

Managerial career
In 1992, he was appointed manager of the Republika Srpska official football team for its first match.

After retiring from playing football, Đurković became a goalkeeping coach and was appointed manager of FK Glasinac Sokolac on three occasions.

He returned to FK Sarajevo as a goalkeeping coach, and worked there for couple of years, mainly between 2005 and 2012.

References

External links
 BiH Timovi u Yu ligi
 

1956 births
Living people
Footballers from Sarajevo
Serbs of Bosnia and Herzegovina
Association football goalkeepers
Yugoslav footballers
FK Glasinac Sokolac players
FK Sarajevo players
Beşiktaş J.K. footballers
Adana Demirspor footballers
Yugoslav First League players
Süper Lig players
Yugoslav expatriate footballers
Expatriate footballers in Turkey
Yugoslav expatriate sportspeople in Turkey
Bosnia and Herzegovina football managers
Association football goalkeeping coaches